The Rio Quente Resorts Tennis Classic is a tennis tournament held in Rio Quente, Brazil since 1999. The event was part of the ATP Challenger Tour in 2012 and 2013, and is played on hard courts.

Past finals

Singles

Doubles

References

External links
Official Website

 
ATP Challenger Tour
Hard court tennis tournaments
Tennis tournaments in Brazil